Natacha Brunelle is a Canadian criminologist, currently at Université du Québec à Trois-Rivières.

References

Year of birth missing (living people)
Living people
Academic staff of the Université du Québec à Trois-Rivières
Canadian criminologists
Canadian women criminologists